José Vicente "Pepu" Hernández Fernández (born 11 February 1958) is a Spanish former professional basketball coach.

Coaching career

Club coaching career
During his club career, Hernández won the Spanish Cup in 2000, and the AEEB Spanish Coach of the Year award in 2004, while he was the head coach of Estudiantes.

National team coaching career
Between 2006 and June 2008, Hernández was the head coach of the senior Spain men's national basketball team, that won the gold medal at the 2006 FIBA World Championship, and the silver medal at the EuroBasket 2007.

Awards and accomplishments

CB Estudiantes
FIBA Korać Cup runner-up: 1999
Spanish Cup winner: 2000
Spanish League runner-up: 2004
AEEB Spanish Coach of the Year: 2004

Spanish senior national team
2006 FIBA World Championship: 
EuroBasket 2007:

Political career
On 30 January 2019, it was announced that Hernández would run in the Spanish Socialist Worker's Party's primary election to select the party challenger to become Mayor of Madrid (vis-à-vis the 2019 Madrid City Council election), facing Manuel de la Rocha and Chema Dávila as rivals. He won the primary election and ran for mayor of Madrid finishing in an all-time-worst fourth place for a PSOE candidate with just 13.7% of the vote.

He is not the only former Spanish men's national basketball team coach in politics. Javier Imbroda also entered politics, joining Citizens in Andalusia.

See also 
 FIBA Basketball World Cup winning head coaches

References

External links
Spanish League Coach Profile 

1958 births
Living people
CB Estudiantes coaches
Joventut Badalona coaches
Liga ACB head coaches
Spanish basketball coaches
Madrid city councillors (2019–2023)